Rubén Ernesto Feldman González (born September 27, 1940 in Resistencia, Chaco) is an Argentinian physician, surgeon, pediatrician, psychiatrist and neurologist, known mainly for his contribution to psychology, having founded holokinetic psychology, as well as his dissemination of the language Esperanto.

He is the author of more than forty books on holokinetic psychology and the human mind, using an approach he calls Unitary Perception.

Medicine and psychiatry 
In 1968, he received his medical degree No. 12387 from National University of Rosario. Between 1968 and 1971 Feldman-González served as a pediatrician for the Mapuche natives of Patagonia (Argentina). He then specializing in pediatrics. In the US, Feldman Gonzalez is graduated as a Physician and Surgeon in March 1976,  Licence No. 36506 in the State of Pennsylvania. He completed a residency in psychiatry in the Warren State Hospital and later in child psychiatry at the University of Miami, where he became an Ad-Honorem Professor in Child Psychiatry for Medical Graduates as Chief of Fellows in Child Psychiatry (1976–1979). In 1980, he became a Graduate of the American Board in Psychiatry and Neurology (ABPN). From 1985 to 1992 he served as a child psychiatrist to a large population in California, mainly for the Coahuila natives and the Chenas of South California and Northern Baja California. Between 1993 and 1998 he served the Athabascan, Eskimo and Inuit natives in Alaska. He carried research about the effects of light and darkness in the human brain, above all in sleep, wakefulness, blood pressure, sex, and alertness. 
Feldman-González obtained medical licenses in the states of Florida No. 27187/1976. California No. A32502/1978 Indiana No. 01041966/1993 and Alaska No. 3174/1993 and later in México No. 5691038/2014.

Holokinetic psychology 
Attempting to simplify his teaching, Rubén Feldman-González said: “The brain is a twelve cylinder engine. We work with a single cylinder for fear of taking off. When two cylinders work at the same time, reality surpasses then fantasy and imagination. Let's get together to see this. Let us be permanent apprentices of life."

His ideas are said to be rooted in the post-quantic Physics promulgated by physicist David Bohm, with the theory of holokinesis, which states that "reality is not fragmented, not divided". It is also based in Karl Pribram's theory of holographic memory, which states that memory is distributed throughout the brain and not in specific zones or engrams, and in Bell's mathematical theorem.

In 1978, Feldman-González was invited by Bohm to the University of London, England, to talk on Unitary Perception. They became lifelong friends.

From 1978, Feldman-González travelled periodically around the world to give workshops, conferences, retreats and seminars on the new psychological paradigm he proposed, emphasizing Unitary Perception, which he said was latent brain function with importance for the individual and society. These tours included India, Argentina, Spain, Chile, Colombia, England, Mexico, Ireland, Nicaragua, Peru, Venezuela, China, and Russia.

Rubén Feldman-González has published many books, which have been partly translated to English, Portuguese, French, German, and Esperanto.

In 1987 he received the nomination as Professor in Psychology and Psychiatry at the International Academy of Sciences of the Republic of San Marino (IAS-RSM), thanks to his advances in the field of scientific psychology. From 1999 to the present, he is the president of the International Academy of Sciences RSM-Mexico, (the first branch of the IAS-RSM outside the European Union), as well as the founder and director of the Center of Psychiatry and Holokinetic Psychology (CPH), with branches in Mexico, Argentina and Spain. From its foundation in May 2012, he is also the president of the International Academy of Holokinetic Psychology (AIPH). He acts as Supervisor and Professor in the Internet Course in Holokinetic Psychology from 2007 to present.

He has shared dialogues, forums, and congresses with investigators and figures in the scientific field, among them the above mentioned Karl Pribram in Stanford University (whom he invited to the University of Baja California [UABC] where he was a professor), and David Bohm in England, who was a fellow of Albert Einstein and candidate for the Nobel Prize in Physics; with Bhurrus Skinner in Miami, Florida; Margaret Mahler and Phyllis Greenacre in Philadelphia; with the educator Jiddu Krishnamurti in California, and with a wide range of university professors and investigators around the world. His encounters and friendship with the latter lasted from 1975 until Krishnamurti's death in 1986. He wrote the book “My Dialogues with Jiddu Krishnamurti” based on these meetings. This book has been cited as a source on Krishnamurti.

Psycho-history 
Feldman-González has written and published digitally a series of psycho-historic novels. In these novels, he tries to bring to light unknown aspects and historical events from different periods.

Esperanto 
Rubén Feldman-González is fluent in Esperanto, and he has emphasized its role as a promoter of understanding and peace. Previous to beginning his university studies in Medicine, he was active in teaching Esperanto. He founded the Esperanto Association in Santa Fe, Argentina, and the Argentine Esperanto Youth Organization (Argentejo), being the first president. In 1966, he founded what became the Pasporta Servo of the World Esperanto Youth Organization, a free international hosting network for Esperanto speakers.

Published work 
 Spanish: El Nuevo Paradigma en Psicología. English: The New Paradigm in Psychology. .
 Spanish: Psicología Holokinética (El único paradigma científico en psicología).
 English: Holokinetic Psychology (The only scientific paradigm in psychology).
 Spanish: La Percepción Unitaria. English: Unitary Perception. . 
 Spanish: La Psicología del Siglo XXI. English: The Psychology of the 21st Century. .
 Spanish: Psicología Cristiana. English: Christian Psychology. .
 Spanish: Latindioamérica. English: Latindioamerica.
 Spanish: Lo profundo de la mente. . 
 English: The Great Leap of Mind: Unitary Perception (Vital Dialogues). .
 Spanish: Mis encuentros con David Bohm. English: My Meetings with David Bohm. 
 Spanish: La mente y la realidad indivisa. English: Mind and Undivided Reality.
 Spanish: La completa encarnación. English: Complete incarnation. .
 Spanish: El libro de Éfeso. English: The book of Ephesus.
 Spanish: Manual del hombre nuevo. English: Manual of the new man.
 Spanish: Sermón del Desierto. English: Sermon of the desert. 
 Spanish: De la prehistoria a la atemporalidad. English: From prehistory to a-temporality.
 Spanish: Mis diálogos con Jiddu Krishnamurti. English: My dialogues with Jiddu Krishnamurti (Donated to KFI [Krishnamurti Foundation India]). .
 Spanish: La salida de la hipnosis mutua y colectiva. English: The way out of mutual and collective hypnosis.
 Spanish: La mente también es Percepcion Unitaria. English: Mind is also Unitary Perception. .
 Spanish: Degeneración, Reproducción y Resurrección. English: Degeneration, Reproduction and Resurrection. .
 Spanish: Relación, religión y aislamiento. English: Relationship, religion and isolation.

Psycho-historic work 
 Spanish: El niño y el viejo. English: The child and the old man.
 Spanish: Aristandro, el mejor de los varones. English: Aristandro, the best man.
 Spanish:  La araña en los juguetes. English: The spider in the toys.
 Spanish: Projecto Ícaro Uno. English: Project Icarus One.
 Spanish: Charity Collins, esclava. English: Charity Collins, slave.
 Spanish: El ensayo de Hamlet. English: Hamlet rehearsal.
 Spanish: Triple infanticidio. English: Triple infanticide.
 Spanish: La adolescente enterrada. English: The buried girl.

References 

1940 births
Living people
Argentine psychiatrists
People from Resistencia, Chaco
Argentine Esperantists
National University of Rosario alumni